Primary Colors is the fourth studio album by Japanese J-pop band Day After Tomorrow.  The first song on the album, "Starry Heavens", was used as the opening theme for the game Tales of Symphonia.

Track listing

References

2004 albums
Avex Group albums
Day After Tomorrow (band) albums